Thouinia is a genus of flowering plants in the family Sapindaceae. The genus is named for André Thouin, a French botanist.
 Kew's Plants of the World Online lists 27 species in the genus:

They are native to Mexico to Central America (within Belize, Costa Rica, El Salvador, Guatemala, Honduras and  Nicaragua) and the Caribbean (within Bahamas, Cuba, the Dominican Republic, Haiti, Puerto Rico and the Turks and Caicos Islands).

Species
Thouinia acuminata 
Thouinia acunae 
Thouinia baracoensis 
Thouinia brachybotrya 
Thouinia canescens 
Thouinia clarensis 
Thouinia cubensis 
Thouinia discolor 
Thouinia domingensis 
Thouinia gibarensis 
Thouinia holguinensis 
Thouinia hypoleuca 
Thouinia leonis 
Thouinia maestrensis 
Thouinia milleri 
Thouinia patentinervis 
Thouinia paucidentata 
Thouinia punctata 
Thouinia racemosa 
Thouinia rotundata 
Thouinia serrata 
Thouinia simplicifolia 
Thouinia striata 
Thouinia stricta 
Thouinia tomentosa 
Thouinia trifoliata 
Thouinia villosa

References

Sapindaceae
Sapindaceae genera
Plants described in 1804
Flora of Mexico
Flora of Central America
Flora of the Caribbean